The Medway Bears were a professional British Ice Hockey team based in Gillingham, England. They played in the British Hockey League's Division One from 1986 to 1991, the English League Division One in 1991–92, the British Hockey League Division One again from 1992 to 1996, and finally the British National League in 1996–97.

Ice hockey teams in England
Sport in Kent
Ice hockey clubs established in 1985
1985 establishments in England